The activating function is a mathematical formalism that is used to approximate the influence of an extracellular field on an axon or neurons. It was developed by Frank Rattay and is a useful tool to approximate the influence of functional electrical stimulation (FES) or neuromodulation techniques on target neurons. It points out locations of high hyperpolarization and depolarization caused by the electrical field acting upon the nerve fiber. As a rule of thumb, the activating function is proportional to the second-order spatial derivative of the extracellular potential along the axon.

Equations 
In a compartment model of an axon, the activating function of compartment n, is derived from the driving term of the external potential, or the equivalent injected current

,

where  is the membrane capacity,  the extracellular voltage outside compartment  relative to the ground and  the axonal resistance of compartment .

The activating function represents the rate of membrane potential change if the neuron is in resting state before the stimulation. Its physical dimensions are V/s or mV/ms. In other words, it represents the slope of the membrane voltage at the beginning of the stimulation.

Following McNeal's simplifications for long fibers of an ideal internode membrane, with both membrane capacity and conductance assumed to be 0 the differential equation determining the membrane potential  for each node is:

,

where  is the constant fiber diameter,  the node-to-node distance,  the node length  the axomplasmatic resistivity,  the capacity and  the ionic currents. From this the activating function follows as:

.

In this case the activating function is proportional to the second order spatial difference of the extracellular potential along the fibers. If  and  then:

.

Thus  is proportional to the second order spatial differential along the fiber.

Interpretation 
Positive values of  suggest a  depolarization of the membrane potential and negative values a hyperpolarization of the membrane potential.

References 

Bioelectrochemistry
Computational neuroscience